Arctus may refer to:
 Arctus (crustacean) Dana, 1852, a genus of crustaceans in the family Scyllaridae
 Arctus Haan in Siebold, 1849, a genus of crustaceans in the family Scyllaridae, synonym of Scyllarus
 Arctus, variant name for the centaur Arktos
   Arctus, one of the Horae